Bosseval-et-Briancourt is a former commune in the Ardennes department in northern France. On 1 January 2017, it was merged into the commune Vrigne-aux-Bois.

Population

See also
Communes of the Ardennes department

References

Former communes of Ardennes (department)
Ardennes communes articles needing translation from French Wikipedia
Populated places disestablished in 2017